The Stanford Cardinal football program represents Stanford University in college football at the NCAA Division I FBS level and is a member of the Pac-12 Conference's North Division. The team is known as the Cardinal, adopted prior to the 1982 season. Stanford was known as the "Cardinal" for its first two decades of athletic competition, then more commonly as the "Cardinals" until 1930. The name was changed to the "Indians" from 1930 to January 1972, and back to the "Cardinals" from 1972 through 1981. A student vote in December 1975 to change the nickname to "Robber Barons" was not approved by administrators.

Stanford has fielded football teams every year since 1892 with a few exceptions. Like a number of other teams from the era concerned with violence in the sport, the school dropped football in favor of rugby from 1906 to 1917. The school also did not field a team in 1918 (due to World War I) or in 1943, 1944, and 1945 (due to World War II).

The school participated in the first-ever Rose Bowl against Michigan in 1902, in which they were routed 49–0. Its annual Big Game against California is the oldest and most storied rivalry in the Pac-12 and western United States. The Cardinal also compete for the Legends Trophy against independent rival Notre Dame.

Stanford claimed national championships in 1926 and 1940. In 1926, led by legendary coach Glenn "Pop" Warner, the team was undefeated in the regular season and tied Alabama in the 1927 Rose Bowl. The 1940 team went unbeaten and untied after defeating Nebraska 21–13 in the 1941 Rose Bowl, but the team ranked No. 2 in the final AP poll released before the game was played.

Pop Warner's era predated the AP poll, but Stanford has finished at least one season in the Top 10 in six different decades under seven different coaches: Claude E. Thornhill in 1934, Clark Shaughnessy in 1940, Chuck Taylor in 1951, John Ralston in 1970 and 1971, Bill Walsh in 1992, Jim Harbaugh in 2010, and David Shaw in 2011, 2012, and 2015.  Coach Shaw, as of the 2017 season, has the most wins of any Stanford coach in history. Stanford's most recent season finish in the top 5 was in 2015 after the No. 5 Cardinal dismantled Big Ten West Division Champion No. 6 Iowa Hawkeyes 45–16 in the 2016 Rose Bowl to finish with a record of 12–2 (Stanford's third 12-win season ever, after 2010 and 2012) and a final ranking of No. 3 in the final AP Poll and the final Coaches Poll (Stanford's highest AP Poll ranking since 1940 and its highest Coaches Poll ranking ever).

The Cardinal have played in 30 bowl games in their history, including 17 appearances in bowls now comprising the College Football Playoff, specifically 15 Rose Bowls (the third-most appearances of any team, behind only USC's 33 appearances and Michigan's 22), the 2011 Orange Bowl, and the 2012 Fiesta Bowl.

Quarterback Jim Plunkett is the only Stanford player to win the Heisman Trophy, doing so in 1970. Stanford players have finished second in Heisman voting six times: quarterback John Elway was second to Herschel Walker in 1982; running back Toby Gerhart was second to Mark Ingram II in 2009; quarterback Andrew Luck finished second to Cam Newton in 2010 and to Robert Griffin III in 2011; running back Christian McCaffrey finished second to Derrick Henry in 2015; and running back Bryce Love finished second to Baker Mayfield in 2017.

History

Early history (1891–1979)

Stanford first fielded a football team in 1891. The team was without a coach and only played a few games. Early football pioneer Walter Camp served as Stanford's head coach in 1892 and from 1894–1895. Football on the Pacific Coast had been on the rise since the late 1910s. Early in 1922, Warner signed a contract with Stanford University in which he would begin coaching in 1924 (after his contract with Pitt expired). Health concerns, a significant pay raise and the rising status of Pacific Coast football made Warner make the big change. Years later, he wrote:I felt my health would be better on the Pacific coast. Weather conditions at Pittsburgh during the football season are rather disagreeable, and much of the late season work had to be done upon a field which was ankle deep in mud. At the close of every season I would be in poor physical condition, twice being rendered incapable of coaching while I recuperated in a hospital. Doctors advised me that the climate of the Pacific coast would be much better for a man of my age and in the work in which I was engaged. In 1924, Warner began his nine-year tenure at Stanford. When he began coaching, Stanford was one of nine teams in the Pacific Coast Conference (PCC). Warner inherited a notable squad from the previous year, including Ernie Nevers (whom Warner considered his greatest player) and All-American ends Ted Shipkey and Jim Lawson.

A season highlight was the final game against Stanford's arch-rival California at California Memorial Stadium, the last game of the regular season. Before the game, both teams were undefeated and Stanford had not beaten California since 1905. Nevers did not play due to a broken ankle. Late in the game, California was leading 20–3; California coach Andy Smith, sure the game was over, began substituting regular players. Warner seized the opportunity to combine passing with the trick plays for which he was known (a fake reverse and a full spinner), and Stanford made a comeback. The game ended in a 20–20 tie.

Because the game was California's second tie, Stanford was chosen to play in the Rose Bowl on New Year's Day against the University of Notre Dame's Fighting Irish coached by Knute Rockne. Like Warner, Rockne is considered one of the greatest coaches in football history. According to journalist Allison Danzig, "With the exception of Knute Rockne of Notre Dame, Pop Warner was the most publicized coach in football." The game was thus a test of two different and highly influential systems of football: "the Warner system with the wing backs, unbalanced line and gigantic power [and the] Knute Rockne system with its rhythmic, dancing shift, lightning speed, balanced line and finely timed blocking". Notre Dame's backfield was composed of the renowned Four Horsemen. Warner's offense moved the ball but was unable to score, and Notre Dame won 27–10.

During the 1925 season, Stanford lost just one PCC game (to Washington); California was finally defeated, 27–7. It was the first year of a new rivalry, with coach Howard Jones and the University of Southern California (USC) team. In their first game, at the Los Angeles Memorial Colosseum, Stanford scored twice in the first half but had to hold off the charging Trojans in a 13–9 win. Because of the loss to Washington, Warner's team was not invited to the Rose Bowl. Stanford won all its 1926 games, crushing California 41–7 and narrowly defeating USC 13–12. Warner's team was invited to the Rose Bowl to play Alabama. Like the game against the Fighting Irish, Stanford dominated but the result was a 7–7 tie. After the game, both teams were recognized as national champions by a number of publications. The 1927 season was one of underachievement and ultimate success. Stanford lost its third game to non-conference St. Mary's College. Stanford's next loss was against non-conference Santa Clara. The game against USC was a 13–13 tie. However, that year, Stanford defeated California 13–6. The game included a bootleg play, the invention of which some credit to Warner. Powers stated that,
Stanford put the game on ice in the fourth period when Pop introduced the bootlegger play, which was to be widely copied and still is in use. On the original bootlegger, Warner made use of Biff Hoffman's tremendous hands. Hoffman would take the pass from center and then fake to another back. Keeping the ball, he would hide it behind him and run as though he had given it to a teammate. Sometimes defensive players would step out of Hoffman's path, thinking he was going to block. Hoffman "bootlegged" for the touchdown against California ... Despite the two losses, Stanford finished the season as PCC co-champion. They were invited to the 1928 Rose Bowl against Pitt, Warner's former team now coached by protégé Jock Sutherland. Warner broke his losing Rose Bowl streak, defeating Sutherland 7–6. The win was Warner's last appearance at the Rose Bowl. The 1929 season is known for Warner's regular use of the hook and lateral, a play that involves a receiver who runs a curl pattern, catches a short pass and immediately laterals the ball to another receiver running a crossing route. According to the October 25, 1929 Stanford Daily, "The trickiness that Pop Warner made famous in his spin plays and passing is very evident ... The frosh have been drilling all week on fast, deceptive forward and lateral pass plays, and together with the reverses will have a widely varied attack". That season brought Warner his second straight loss to Jones, with Stanford defeated by the Trojans 7–0. USC won the conference, and went to the Rose Bowl. Jones went on to win every year thereafter, including 1932, Warner's last season at Stanford. Because of the five consecutive defeats, Warner was severely criticized by Stanford alumni. In all, Warner and Jones played eight games; Jones won five, Warner two and one was a tie. Against Stanford's main rival, California, Warner won five games, tied three and lost one. After Warner's departure, Claude E. Thornhill was promoted from line coach and named head coach. In his first three years, Thornhill's team, which had named itself the Vow Boys due to their promise never to lose to USC, led his Indians to the Rose Bowl each season. Thornhill was the first Stanford coach to lead his team to postseason play in his first three seasons, a feat not matched until David Shaw's 2011 to 2013 teams. Stanford lost Thornhill's first two appearances, but won the 1936 Rose Bowl over SMU, 7–0. After the first three seasons, Thornhill's teams went steadily downhill, culminating in a 1–7–1 season in 1939, after which Thornhill was fired and replaced by Clark Shaughnessy. Marchmont Schwartz led Stanford's football program from 1942 to 1950 (Stanford did not field a football team from 1943 to 1945 because of World War II). During his tenure, Stanford made one bowl appearance, a win in the 1949 Pineapple Bowl. Chuck Taylor led Stanford's football team from 1951–1957. Taylor's 1951 team finished 9–2 and lost in the Rose Bowl. The tenure of Jack Curtice was a dismal one. The Indians compiled a record of 14–36 from 1957 to 1962, which included an 0–10 campaign in 1960.

John Ralston came to Stanford in 1963 and helped revive a sagging program. Over nine seasons, Ralston guided the team back to national respectability while building a mark of 55–36–3.  In his last two seasons, 1970–1971, Ralston's teams won two Pacific-8 titles and notched back-to-back Rose Bowl victories over Ohio State and Michigan, both of whom were undefeated coming into the Rose Bowl game.  Under Ralston's tutelage, Stanford quarterback Jim Plunkett won the Heisman Trophy in 1970. Plunkett and a stout defense led the team to a 9–3 record in 1970, an effort which resulted in a Rose Bowl victory, the program's 4th. Plunkett also won the Heisman trophy that season, and he remains the only Stanford player to receive the award. Stanford won the Rose Bowl again the following year, 13–12 over Michigan, as Stanford kicker Rod Garcia booted a 31-yard field goal with 12 seconds left in the game. Ralston left Stanford following the 1971 season to take his talents to the NFL, accepting the position of head coach for the Denver Broncos. In January 1972, when Ralston left to coach the NFL's Denver Broncos, Jack Christiansen was promoted from assistant coach and hired as Stanford's head coach. Christiansen spent five years as Stanford's head coach, compiling a winning record each year and a 30–22–3 overall record. He was criticized for starting Mike Cordova rather than Guy Benjamin at quarterback during the 1975 season and for switching between quarterbacks during the 1976 season. One day prior to the final game of the 1976 season, Stanford announced that it was terminating Christiansen as its head coach. Under Christianson, Stanford never had a losing season, though Christiansen's tenure was largely marked by mediocrity. He left Stanford in 1976, having amassed a 30–22–3 record. In 1977, Bill Walsh was hired as the head coach. He stayed for two seasons. His two Stanford teams were successful, posting a 9–3 record in 1977 with a win in the Sun Bowl, and 8–4 in 1978 with a win in the Bluebonnet Bowl. His notable players at Stanford included quarterbacks Guy Benjamin and Steve Dils, wide receivers James Lofton and Ken Margerum, linebacker Gordy Ceresino, in addition to running back Darrin Nelson. Walsh was the Pac-8 Conference Coach of the Year in 1977. Walsh left Stanford after the 1978 season to move to the NFL's San Francisco 49ers, where he would earn a reputation as one of the NFL's greatest head coaches of all time. In 1979, Rod Dowhower was promoted from wide receivers coach to Stanford's head coach. In his lone season, Stanford compiled a record of 5–5–1. Future NFL hall of famer John Elway enrolled at Stanford in 1979. Elway became one of Stanford's most iconic and successful players; however, the team struggled during his tenure.

Paul Wiggin era (1980–1983)
New Orleans Saints defensive coordinator Paul Wiggin was hired as head coach at his alma mater on February 1, 1980. Despite the presence of quarterback John Elway on the team during his first three years, Wiggin was unable to lead Stanford to a bowl game during his tenure and was dismissed following the 1983 season with a 16–28 record over four years.  Wiggin's efforts to reach a bowl game had come agonizingly close in 1982, when his team fell victim to what simply became known as The Play on November 20. In an incredible finish against Cal, the school's arch-rival, Stanford, led by quarterback Elway, drove down the field to kick a go-ahead field goal with just seconds left. On the ensuing kickoff, Cal lateraled five times to score the winning touchdown. Elway's career culminated in that game's loss, a game Stanford athletic director Andy Geiger said cost Elway the Heisman Trophy. Wiggin was fired following a poor 1–10 campaign in 1983.

Jack Elway era (1984–1988)
Succeeding Wiggin as the Cardinal's head coach was John Elway's father, Jack Elway, who came to Stanford from San Jose State. Under his tutelage, the Cardinal compiled a record of 25–29–2. The best season during the Elway era was an 8–4 campaign in 1986, which culminated in a loss in the Gator Bowl. That season would be the only winning campaign during Elway's tenure as head coach. He was dismissed after 3–6–2 season in 1988.

Dennis Green era (1989–1991)
In 1989, former Northwestern head coach Dennis Green left the 49ers, where he was serving as wide receivers coach, and took the head coaching position at Stanford, inheriting a team that had graduated 17 of its 21 starters from 1988. Green led the Cardinal from 1989 to 1991. During that time, his teams finished with an overall record of 16–18, going 3–0 in the Big Game against the California Golden Bears. In 1990, his Stanford team defeated the top-ranked Notre Dame in South Bend, Indiana. His tenure culminated with an 8–4 record (Stanford's best since 1986). A loss to Washington in the opening game of the season was the deciding factor for the Pac-10 championship. The Cardinal made an appearance in the 1991 Aloha Bowl, where his team lost to Georgia Tech on a last-minute touchdown. Green left Stanford after three seasons to accept the head coaching position with the NFL's Minnesota Vikings.

Walsh's return (1992–1994)
Bill Walsh returned to Stanford as head coach in 1992, leading the Cardinal to a 10–3 record and a Pacific-10 Conference co-championship. Stanford finished the season with an upset victory over Penn State in the Blockbuster Bowl on January 1, 1993 and a # 9 ranking in the final AP Poll. In 1994, after consecutive losing seasons, Walsh left Stanford and retired from coaching.

Tyrone Willingham era (1995–2001)

Despite lacking experience as a head coach or coordinator, Tyrone Willingham was appointed head coach of the football program at Stanford, succeeding Bill Walsh. In his seven seasons as head coach, he led the Cardinal to a 44–36–1 record and four bowl game appearances. In 2000, he was presented with the Eddie Robinson Coach of Distinction Award that is given annually to honor "an outstanding college football coach and role model for career achievement". His best team was the 1999 team, which won the school's first outright Pacific-10 Conference title in 29 years and appeared in the 2000 Rose Bowl.  Willingham's 44 wins were the most by a Stanford coach since John Ralston. Troy Walters was arguably Stanford's best player during this time, receiving All-American honors and the Fred Biletnikoff Award in 1999, and setting school career records in receiving yards and receptions. Willingham left Stanford following the 2001 season to accept the head coaching position at Notre Dame.

Buddy Teevens era (2002–2004)
Buddy Teevens coached Stanford from 2002 to 2004. In his three years at the Farm, his teams posted a 10–23 record,  beat BYU twice and San Jose State three times. However, Stanford failed to improve much during his tenure. Teevens went winless against rivals USC, Cal, and Notre Dame, and never posted a win against a team that finished the season with a winning record. Teevens was fired on November 29, 2004.  The Associated Press noted that Teevens was "respected for his class and loyalty" and that he even appeared at the official announcement of his firing.

Walt Harris era (2005–2006)
Walt Harris was the head coach at Stanford for two seasons. In his first season as head coach there he posted a record of 5–6. In his second season as head coach the team posted a 1–11 record, the school's worst since going 0–10 in 1960. Harris was notorious for the extremely rare and bizarre decision to punt on 3rd down while trailing UCLA 7–0 on October 1, 2006 during his second season. He was fired on December 4, 2006, two days after Stanford's regular season ended.  By the end of his tenure at Stanford, Harris had surpassed Jack Curtice with the lowest winning percentage in the history of Stanford football, with a .261 mark.

Jim Harbaugh era (2007–2010)

Jim Harbaugh was named the head football coach at Stanford University in December 2006, replacing Walt Harris. Harbaugh's father, Jack, was Stanford's defensive coordinator from 1980–1981, while Harbaugh attended Palo Alto High School, located directly across the street from Stanford Stadium.

Harbaugh stirred some intra-conference controversy in March 2007, when he was quoted as saying rival USC head coach "Pete Carroll's only got one more year, though. He'll be there one more year. That's what I've heard. I heard it inside the staff." Upon further questions, Harbaugh claimed he had heard it from staff at USC. The comment caused a rebuke from Carroll. (In fact, Carroll would be at USC for three more years.) At the Pacific-10 Conference media day on July 26, 2007, Harbaugh praised the Trojans, stating "There is no question in my mind that USC is the best team in the country and may be the best team in the history of college football." The declaration, especially in light of his earlier comment, garnered more media attention. Later in the season, Stanford defeated No. 1 USC 24–23 with a touchdown in the final minute. With USC being the favorite by 41 points, it was statistically the greatest upset in college football history. Although Stanford lost to USC in 2008, Harbaugh and the Stanford Cardinal upset USC at home again with a score of 55–21 on November 14, 2009. Stanford's 55 points was the most ever scored on USC in the Trojans' history until Oregon scored 62 in a 62–51 win over USC on November 3, 2012. It was Pete Carroll's first November loss as USC head coach. Harbaugh never lost in USC's home stadium, the Los Angeles Memorial Coliseum. In January 2009, Harbaugh was confirmed to have been interviewed by the New York Jets for the head coach position, although the job was eventually offered to Rex Ryan.

In 2009, the Cardinal had a comeback season, finishing the regular season at 8–4, finishing No. 21 in the polls, and receiving an invitation to play in the 2009 Sun Bowl, the Cardinal's first bowl appearance since 2001. Running back Toby Gerhart was named a Heisman Trophy finalist, finishing second to Mark Ingram II in the closest margin of voting in Heisman history. On December 13, 2009, Harbaugh was rewarded with a three-year contract extension through the 2014 season. The 2010 season brought more success for Harbaugh and the Cardinal. The team went 11–1 in the regular season, with their only loss coming from Oregon, a team that was undefeated and earned a berth in the BCS National Championship Game. The first 11 win season in program history earned the Cardinal a No. 4 BCS ranking and a BCS bowl invitation to the Orange Bowl. Stanford defeated Virginia Tech 40–12 for the Cardinal's first bowl win since 1996 and the first BCS bowl victory in program history. Second year starting quarterback Andrew Luck was the runner-up to for the Heisman Trophy, the second year in a row that the runner-up was from Stanford. Harbaugh's 4-year record at Stanford was 29–21 (.580). Harbaugh was named the winner of the Woody Hayes Coach of the Year Award.

David Shaw era (2011–2022)
After Harbaugh left to coach the San Francisco 49ers, the team's offensive coordinator David Shaw became head coach. Shaw led the team to three consecutive BCS bowl games, including two Rose Bowls. The team was led by its quarterback, Andrew Luck, and its dominating defense. After Luck departed for the NFL Draft, Kevin Hogan became the team's starting quarterback. Hogan led the team to a Rose Bowl victory over Wisconsin. The team returned to the Rose Bowl again the following year in the 2013 season, but lost a heart-breaker to Michigan State. After a rebuilding season in 2014, the 2015 season saw Shaw, Hogan, and Heisman runner upChristian McCaffrey lead Stanford to its third Pac-12 championship in four years, and consequently, its third Rose Bowl in four years. With the 2015 conference title, Shaw became the first Stanford coach in 80 years to win three conference titles and only the third ever in program history (after Tiny Thornhill from 1933–1935 and Pop Warner in 1924, 1926, and 1927). In 2017, Shaw once again led Stanford to a Pac-12 Championship appearance with Heisman runner up Bryce Love only to lose to rival USC. After two consecutive 3–9 seasons, Shaw resigned as head coach, effective immediately, on November 27, 2022, just over an hour after the end of Stanford's last game of the 2022 season.

Troy Taylor era (2023–recent)

Conference affiliations
 Independent (1891–1905)
 Pac-12 Conference (1919–present)
 Pacific Coast Conference (1919–1958)
 Athletic Association of Western Universities (1959–1967)
 Pacific-8 Conference (1968–1977)
 Pacific-10 Conference (1978–2010)
 Pac-12 Conference (2011–2024)
 Pac-10 Conference (starting 2024)

Championships

National championships
Stanford has won two (1926, 1940) national championships from NCAA-designated major selectors. Stanford claims both of these national championships.

Conference championships
Stanford has won 15 conference championships, with four shared. They have the fourth most in the Pac-12 Conference, behind UCLA, USC, and Washington.

† Co-championship

Division championships

† Co-championship

Bowl games

Stanford has participated in 30 bowl games. The Cardinal have a 15–14–1 bowl record.

Head coaches 

The following are Stanford's head coaches through the 2017 season.

Individual honors
See also Stanford Cardinal football statistical leaders

Award winners

Associated Press College Football Player of the Year
Christian McCaffrey – 2015
Chic Harley Award
Jim Plunkett – 1970
Doak Walker Award
Toby Gerhart – 2009
Bryce Love – 2017
Fred Biletnikoff Award
Troy Walters – 1999
Heisman Trophy
Jim Plunkett – 1970
Jet Award
Ty Montgomery – 2013
Christian McCaffrey – 2015
Johnny Unitas Golden Arm Award
Andrew Luck – 2011
Maxwell Award
Jim Plunkett – 1970
Andrew Luck – 2011
Outland Trophy
Joshua Garnett – 2015
Paul Hornung Award
Owen Marecic – 2010
Christian McCaffrey – 2015
Sammy Baugh Trophy
Dick Norman – 1959
Guy Benjamin – 1977
Steve Dils – 1978
John Elway – 1982
Walter Camp Award
Jim Plunkett – 1970
Andrew Luck – 2011

Retired numbers

Stanford has retired the following numbers.

College Football Hall of Fame
The following Stanford players and coaches are members of the College Football Hall of Fame:

Frankie Albert
John Brodie
Chris Burford
Walter Camp (coach)
Bill Corbus
John Elway
Hugh "Duke" Gallarneau
Bobby Grayson
Bob "Bones" Hamilton
Andrew Kerr (coach)
Andrew Luck
Bill McColl
James "Monk" Moscrip
Darrin Nelson
Ernie Nevers
Jim Plunkett
John Ralston (coach)
Bob Reynolds
Clark Shaughnessy (coach)
Jeff Siemon
Chuck Taylor
Pop Warner (coach)
Paul Wiggin
Fielding H. Yost (coach)

Pro Football Hall of Famers
The following Stanford players are members of the Pro Football Hall of Fame:

John Elway
James Lofton
John Lynch
Ernie Nevers

Stanford Athletic Hall of Fame
The following Stanford players and coaches are members of the Stanford Athletic Hall of Fame

Frankie Albert
Frank Alustiza
Bruno Banducci
Benny Barnes
Guy Benjamin
John Brodie
Jackie Brown
George Buehler
Don Bunce
Chris Burford
Ernie Caddel
Gordy Ceresino
Jack Chapple
Bill Corbus
Murray Cuddeback
Ed Cummings
Dud DeGroot
Steve Dils
Pat Donovan
Mike Dotterer
John Elway
Chuck Evans
Skip Face
Hugh Gallarneau
Bobby Garrett
Bobby Grayson
Bob "Bones" Hamilton
Ray Handley
Walt Heinecke
Tony Hill
Biff Hoffman
Brian Holloway
Dick Horn
Dick Hyland
Gary Kerkorian
Gordon King
Pete Kmetovic
Jim Lawson
Pete Lazetich
Vic Lindskog
James Lofton
John Lynch
Ken Margerum
Norm Manoogian
Ed McCaffrey
Bill McColl
Duncan McColl
Hal McCreery
Glyn Milburn
Phil Moffatt
Bob Moore
Sam Morley
Monk Moscrip
Wes Muller
Brad Muster
Darrin Nelson
Ernie Nevers
Blaine Nye
Don Parish
John Paye
Jim Plunkett
Seraphim Post
John Ralston
Bob Reynolds
Don Robesky
Ken Rose
Harlow Rothert
John Sande III
Clark Shaughnessy
Harry Shipkey
Ted Shipkey
Jeff Siemon
Bob Sims
Malcolm Snider
Norm Standlee
Roger Stillwell
Chuck Taylor 
Dink Templeton
Keith Topping
Tommy Vardell
Randy Vataha
Garin Veris
Bill Walsh
Glenn "Pop" Warner
Gene Washington
Bob Whitfield
Paul Wiggin
Dave Wyman

Rivalries

California

Stanford's main rival is California (Cal). The rivalry between the two schools is one of the oldest in college football. The two teams play in the Big Game with the winner receiving the Stanford Axe. The most famous moment of the rivalry occurred in the 1982 Big Game, when Cal used a series of laterals to defeat Stanford 25–20 as time expired. Stanford leads the series 64–47–11.

USC

Stanford maintains an active rivalry with USC. In 2007, an unranked Stanford team upset a No. 1 ranked USC team 24–23. Stanford was a 41-point underdog prior to the game, and many observers have called it the greatest upset in college football history. In 2009, Stanford defeated USC 55–21, resulting in a post-game verbal confrontation between Harbaugh and USC head coach Pete Carroll. In 2013, USC returned the favor by defeating No. 5 Stanford 20–17. In 2015, un-ranked Stanford went into L.A. and left with a 41–31 win over No. 6 USC, with Stanford QB Kevin Hogan playing the majority of the second half with a sprained ankle. USC leads the series 62–33–3.

Notre Dame

Notre Dame and Stanford have been rivals since 1925. The two teams have met every year since 1988, with the exception of 1995 and 1996. Notre Dame leads the series 20–13.

San Jose State

Stanford and San Jose State have been rivals since 1900. These two institutions are separated by approximately 23 miles in the Silicon Valley. The rivalry was named after Bill Walsh, who was a SJSU alumnus and positively contributed to Stanford Cardinal football through head coaching, notably the win against No. 21 Penn State in the 1993 Blockbuster Bowl, which later became the Cheez-It Bowl. Stanford leads the series 52–14–1, where the vast majority of matches have been played at Stanford.

Future non-conference opponents
Announced schedules as of February 3, 2020.
No games are scheduled for the 2034 season.

Notes

References

Bibliography

External links

 

 
American football teams established in 1892
1892 establishments in California